"We Don't Have to Hold Out" is a song written by Aidan Mason and Gordon Adams, and recorded by Canadian country music artist Anne Murray.  It was released in June 1981 as the second single from her album Where Do You Go When You Dream.  The song reached number 1 on the RPM Adult Contemporary Tracks chart in August 1981.

Chart performance

References

1981 singles
1981 songs
Anne Murray songs
Capitol Records singles
Song recordings produced by Jim Ed Norman